In Croatia, there are over 2,900 people who consider themselves German, most of these Danube Swabians. Germans are officially recognized as an autochthonous national minority, and as such, they elect a special representative to the Croatian Parliament, shared with members of eleven other national minorities. They are mainly concentrated in the area around Osijek (German: Esseg) in eastern Slavonia.

Ethnology

The community traditionally inhabited northern Croatia and Slavonia.  In the Early modern period they had settled from other territories in the Habsburg monarchy, and in what is today Croatia mainly settled territories of the Military Frontier. The Danube Swabians that inhabited Western Slavonia were subject to strong Croatization. The Croatian intelligentsia only acknowledged a German minority in 1865.

History

With the dissolution of the Austro-Hungarian Empire and the establishment of the Kingdom of Serbs, Croats and Slovenes, the Germans of Croatia became a minority. In 1920, Germans established the cultural association Kulturbund. Kulturbund was banned on April 11, 1924 by Minister of the Interior Svetozar Pribićević. The following government of Ljuba Davidović and the Democratic Party saw the ban lifted.

In 1922, they formed the German Party (Partei der Deutschen). The party existed until it was banned as part of King Alexander's dictatorship in 1929. 

The Croatian German population reached 85,781 in the 1900 census, while this number plummeted after the German exodus in the aftermath of World War II. The Austro-Hungarian census of  1910 recorded 134,000 Germans. After World War II, 100,000 Yugoslav Germans fled to Austria. This population was not dealt with in the Potsdam Agreement which prevented them from being repatriated to Germany. The Allies considered them Yugoslavian citizens and sought their repatriation there. However, on June 4 the Communist Party of Yugoslavia released a decree that rescinded the citizenship of Yugoslavian Germans. Their property was henceforth confiscated, and the majority settled in Germany and Austria. Some managed to return to Yugoslavia and returned to their homes.

The historically predominantly German town of Čeminac built the parish Church of Sacred Heart of Christ in 1906-1907. The German population in the town was forced to leave in 1945. After democratic changes in Croatia in 1990, former inhabitants of the town, mostly living in Germany, repaired the church. However, on April 10, 1992 the church was burnt by Serb forces as part of the Croatian War of Independence. In 2001, various levels of the Croatian government contributed to its repairs, which were carried out by 2005.

In 1996, Croatia and Germany signed an agreement to facilitate the marking of German graves from the World Wars in Croatia. There are German military cemeteries in Pula, Split and Zagreb.  In 2005, the Croatian government passed a comprehensive law on the return of nationalized Austrian property to its rightful owners.

Demographics
According to the 2011 Croatian census, there are 2,965 Germans in Croatia.

Geography
The main locations in Slavonia formerly settled by Germans include:

 Darda (Darda)
 Jagodnjak (Katschfeld)
 Josipovac-Kravice (Oberjosefsdorf-Krawitz)
 Kula (Kula-Josefsfeld)
 Osijek (Esseg)
 Sarvaš (Sarwasch-Hirschfeld)
 Satnica Đakovačka (Satnitz)
 Slavonski Brod (Brod)
 Harkanovci (Kawinz)

There were many German settlements in the adjacent region of Syrmia (Symrien); there is still a village called Nijemci which literally translates to "Germans". The main locations in the Croatian part of Syrmia formerly settled by Germans include:

 Vukovar (Wukowar)
 Novo Selo (Neudorf), now the western part of Vinkovci
 Opatovac (Sankt Lorenz)
 Lovas (Lowas)
 Jarmina (Jahrmein)
 Berak
 Tompojevci
 Tovarnik (Sankt Georg)
 Ilača (Illatsch)
 Svinjarevci
 Bapska (Babska)
 Orolik
 Banovci
 Novi Jankovci (Neu-Jankowzi)
 Ernestinovo (Ernestinenhof) 
German settlements in Western Slavonia:
 Hrastovac (Eichendorf)
 Blagorodovac (Blagorodowatz) 
 Filipovac
 Antunovac
 Dobrovac
 Mali Bastaji
 Veliki Miletinac
 Đulovac (Wercke)
 Novo Zvečevo (Papuck)

Culture

Organizations
The Germans and Austrians have created the Society of Germans and Austrians of Croatia. There is a German culture centre in Osijek, and a small number of German schools in the area.

Since the fall of communism and Croatian independence, the minority has held an annual academic conference titled Germans and Austrians in the Croatian cultural circle.

Anthropology

Surnames
Examples of Croatianized Germanic surnames in Croatia include Ajhner (Eichner), Bahman (Bachmann), Birer (Bührer), Ceglec (Ziegler), Cukerić (Zucker), Flajs (Fleiss), Fresel (Fressl), Goldštajn (Goldstein), Gotvald (Gottwald), Helfrich (Helfricht), Hohšteter (Hochstädter), Kunštek (Kunst), Majer, Majerić, Majerović (from Mayer/Meyer/Meier), Šmit (Schmidt), Šnidarić, Šnidaršić (Schneider), Špic (Spitz), Špicmiler (Spitzmüller), Šturmer (Stürmer), Šuflaj (Schufflei), Šuper (Schupper), Švarc (Schwarz), Tabajner (Tappeiner), Tišlarić (Tischler), Tunkel (Dunkel), Vinšer (Wünscher), Vitman (Wittman), etc. Among surnames that have retained their original form, Mayer/Meyer, Schmidt, Hermann, Bauer, Wolf, Fischer, Schneider, Schwarz, Richter, Müller, Zimmermann, Wagner, are examples of those found in greater numbers.

Notable people

Ljudevit Gaj (1809–1872), linguist, from Krapina-Zagorje
Adolfo Veber Tkalčević (1825–1889), philologist, Moravian German father
Josip Stadler (1843–1918), Catholic archbishop, from Slavonski Brod
Ivan Merz (1896–1928), Catholic lay academic and saint, from Banja Luka
Pavao Štoos (1806–1862), Catholic priest and poet, from Zagreb
Anton Geiser (1924–2012), Nazi, from Đakovo
Rikard Jorgovanić (1853–1880), writer, from Krapina-Zagorje, Bohemian German father
Vjekoslav Klaić (1849–1928), historian, from Slavonski Brod, German mother
Pavao Ritter Vitezović (1652–1713), writer and diplomat, German father
Velimir Neidhardt (born 1943), architect, from Zagreb
Franjo Maixner (1841–1903), academic and professor, from Osijek
Ferdinand Kulmer (1925–1998), painter, from Zagreb
Ljudevit Jonke (1907–1979), linguist, from Karlovac
Josip Hamm (1905–1986), Slavist, from Osijek-Baranja
Željko Reiner (born 1953), politician, from Zagreb
Josip Schlosser (1801–1882), physician
Josip Seissel (1904–1987), architect, from Krapina-Zagorje
Josip Juraj Strossmayer (1815-1905), politician, Roman Catholic bishop, and benefactor, from Osijek
Ante Šercer (1896–1968), physician, from Požega
Ivo Šlaus (born 1931), physicist, from Split
Rajko Grlić (born 1947), film director from Zagreb
Branko Schmidt (born 1957),film director from Osijek
Radovan Fuchs (born 1953), scientist and politician serving as Minister of Science and Education in the Government of Croatia since 2020
Gordon Schildenfeld (born 1985), football player from Šibenik
Željko Koenigsknecht (born 1961), film actor from Vukovar
Inge Appelt (born 1943), actress

See also

 Volksdeutsche
 Wehrbauer
 Valpovo work camp

References

Sources

Geiger, V., 2008. Josip Broz Tito i sudbina jugoslavenskih Nijemaca. Časopis za suvremenu povijest, 40(3), pp.789-818.
Mira Kolar-Dimitrijević, Skrivene biografije nekih Nijemaca i Austrijanaca u Hrvatskoj 19. i 20. stoljeća, Osijek, 2001.
Kolar-Dimitrijević, M., 1994. Nijemci u podravini. U: GB Richembergh (prir.), Nijemci u Hrvatskoj: Jučer i danas (Zbornik). Zagreb: Volksdeutsche Gemeinschaft, pp.43-50.
TRADICIJSKI ŽIVOT MAĐARA I NIJEMACA U RETFALI, DIJELU OSIJEKA; Vlasta Šabić ; Muzej Slavonije, Osijek, Hrvatska str. 105-120
Osvrt na važnije radove o Nijemcima u Požegi i Požeškoj kotlini; Vladimir Geiger str. 296-307
Migracije njemačkog stanovništva na hrvatskom području tijekom Drugoga svjetskog rata i poraća; Marica Karakaš Obradov str. 271-294

External links
 Community of Germans in Croatia 
 Representation of the German national minority of the City of Zagreb
 

Croatia
Ethnic groups in Croatia